Bekhbatyn Ganbat (born 20 April 1988) is a Mongolian international footballer. He made his first appearance for the Mongolia national football team in 2011.

References

1988 births
Mongolian footballers
Mongolia international footballers
Living people
Association football defenders